Nykesha Simone Sales (born May 10, 1976) is an American assistant coach at the University of Georgia. She is a former professional basketball player in the WNBA, as well as playing in the Bosnian league for the ZKK Mladi Krajisnik club. Her primary position is the small forward. Her second position is shooting guard. In 1999 Sales was added to the roster of the USA FIBA Senior National Team. Her brother Brooks Sales played forward for Villanova from 1998 to 2002, and currently plays overseas in Spain for the Club Baloncesto Breogán of Lugo.

High school
Sales attended Bloomfield High School in Bloomfield, Connecticut, and lettered in basketball. She was named the USA Today High School National Player of the Year in basketball, as a senior. Sales was named a High School All-American by the WBCA. She participated in the WBCA High School All-America Game in 1994, scoring 21 points.

Amateur career
Sales attended the University of Connecticut (UConn) as a business major from 1994 to 1998. She was a member of the powerhouse UConn women's basketball team.

In 1995 she helped lead UConn to an undefeated NCAA Women's Division I Basketball Championship as well as a Final Four appearance in the 1996 NCAA Tournament. She was named Big East Rookie of the Year in 1995.  In 1997 she was a member of the Gold medal USA Women's World University Games. In 1997-98 she helped the team make two Elite Eight appearances. In the 1997–98 season, she was named to the All-American first team, Defensive Player of the Year, and also the BIG EAST Player of the Year. She was also named to the 1996–97 and 1997-98 Kodak All-America teams. Sales was a member of the inaugural class (2006) of inductees to the University of Connecticut women's basketball "Huskies of Honor" recognition program.

USA Basketball
Sales was named to the team representing the US at the 1994 William Jones Cup competition in Taipei, Taiwan. The USA team won all eight games, winning the gold medal, but not without close calls. In three games the teams had to come from behind to win. One preliminary game ended up as a single-point victory, and the gold medal game went to overtime before the USA team beat South Korea by a single point, 90–89. Sales averaged 2.5 points per game.

Sales competed with USA Basketball as a member of the 1995 Jones Cup Team that won the Bronze in Taipei. She averaged 7.8 points per game and was second on the team in steals, with ten.

Sales was invited to be a member of the Jones Cup team representing the US in 1996. She helped the team to a 9–0 record, and the gold medal in the event. Sales averaged 4.8 points per game.

Sales represented the US at the 1997 World University Games held in Marsala, Sicily, Italy in August 1997. The USA team won all six games, earning the gold medal at the event. Sales was the team's leading scorer, averaging 18.3 points per game. In the game against Cuba, Sales scored 32 points, which set a record for points scored in a gold medal game, and represents the third highest point total by an American recorded at the World University Games.

UConn scoring record controversy
Sales left college as UConn's all-time leading scorer with 2,178 career points. She scored the record-breaking points as part of a staged controversial layup. Sales had suffered an injury that had essentially ended her collegiate career. UConn's next game (against Villanova University) began with Villanova permitting Sales to complete an uncontested layup; UConn then returned the favor, allowing Villanova to score (the game essentially began with a 2–2 score before serious play commenced). UConn head coach Geno Auriemma felt bad that Sales did not already have the record, as he had made her sit on many occasions to avoid running up the score. The staged basket, while questioned in retrospect, was his attempt to make it up to her. He contacted the previous record holder, Kerry Bascom, as well as Big East Commissioner Mike Tranghese to ensure that the incident would not be a problem, although the media was, and to a degree continues to be, critical of the move. Sales's record would eventually be broken by Tina Charles.

Incidentally, Sales wore #24 in high school, the same number worn by Kerry Bascom at Connecticut. When Sales was considering going to Connecticut, she was respectful enough of Bascom's position, that she asked if she could wear #42, reversing the digits, rather than asking to wear #24.

Professional career

WNBA
In 1998, Sales was assigned to the Orlando Miracle as part of the expansion draft. She remained with the franchise even when the Miracle relocated to Uncasville, Connecticut and was renamed the Connecticut Sun prior to the 2003 season. She helped lead the team to the WNBA Finals in 2004 and 2005.  Sales has been named to the  WNBA All-Star team six times. Until she missed 12 games in the 2006 season, Sales had started 248 consecutive regular season games, the second longest such streak in WNBA history.

Despite repeatedly making the annual all-star team since the beginning of her career, Sales was left off the announced All-Decade Team on June 13, 2006 as part of a celebration of the league's 10th Anniversary.  On March 11, 2008, Sales noted that she would not participate in the 2008 WNBA campaign due to nagging injuries.  Sales also noted that her sitting out was not an early retirement, but just a break. However, she ultimately did not return to the WNBA.

International
 2005-2006:  Gambrinus Brno
 2007:  Lotos Gdynia
 2007-2008:  TEO Vilnius and  SK Cēsis
 2008-2009:  SK Cēsis and  ZVVZ USK Praha
 2010-2013       Besiktas JK and  Beşiktaş JK
 2013- :  ZKK Mladi Krajisnik and  ZKK Mladi Krajisnik

Sports diplomacy 
Sales has also been an active participant in the SportsUnited Sports Envoy program for the U.S. Department of State. In this function, she has traveled to Cape Verde, Haiti, the Republic of Korea, Uganda, Ukraine, and Venezuela, where she worked with the likes of Becky Bonner, Christopher Clunie, Samuel Dalembert, Alex English, Willie Greens, Jason Maxiell and Tamika Raymond to conduct basketball clinics and events that directly or indirectly reached more than 2350 youth from underserved areas. In so doing, Sales helped contribute to SportsUnited's mission to reach out to youth populations in order to promote community leadership, education, women's inclusion and empowerment, inclusion of marginalized communities, and the inclusion of people with disabilities.

University of Connecticut statistics

See also
 List of Connecticut women's basketball players with 1000 points

References

External links
Georgia Bulldogs bio
UCF Knights bio
WNBA Player Profile
WNBA article on her fitness routine

1976 births
Living people
All-American college women's basketball players
American women's basketball players
Basketball coaches from Connecticut
Basketball players from Connecticut
Connecticut Sun players
Maccabi Haifa B.C. players
Orlando Miracle players
Parade High School All-Americans (girls' basketball)
People from Bloomfield, Connecticut
Small forwards
UCF Knights women's basketball coaches
UConn Huskies women's basketball players
Universiade gold medalists for the United States
Universiade medalists in basketball
Women's National Basketball Association All-Stars
Bloomfield High School (Connecticut) alumni